Garzes Tower (or Torre della Garza), also known as Saint Martin's Tower, was a watchtower built in Mġarr, Gozo by the Order of Saint John in 1605. It was named after Martin Garzez, the Grand Master who financed its construction, even though it was eventually built after his death during the Magistry of Alof de Wignacourt. The tower was demolished in the 19th century, some remains were reused for the building of a bridge, and the site was developed with a hotel.

It was built to the design of Vittorio Cassar. A number a coastal towers, built by Grandmaster Wignacourt, are traditionally attributed to Cassar and based on the Garzes tower. However this is probably based on speculations It is likely that Cassar's design of Garzes Tower was used, and adequately modified, to built the other towers due to their similarity in their military architecture.

Background
In the fifteenth to seventeenth centuries, Gozo was prone to attacks by Barbary corsairs, along with most of Malta and other coastal areas in the Mediterranean and Europe. The harbour of Mġarr was commonly used by pirates to replenish with water and plunder the surrounding area. The worst attack occurred in July 1551, when Ottoman forces aided by corsairs tried to take over Malta but failed so they landed in Gozo, besieged the Cittadela and took almost the entire population of about 5000 to 6000 people as slaves (with the exception of a monk, some 40 elderly Gozitans and about 300 who managed to escape and hide). The slaves were taken aboard Ottoman ships from Mġarr Harbour itself.

Before this attack, there had already been proposals to build a tower to guard Mġarr Harbour and the Gozo Channel. In 1418, the people made a petition to build such a tower but nothing materialized. In 1599, a report was made about the defence of Gozo, and the military engineer Giovanni Rinaldini made it clear that a tower was necessary in that area to prevent any future attacks. The Grand Master at that time, Martin Garzez, realized this so he decided to finance the building of a tower himself. He allocated 12,000 scudi for the building of the tower, but he died in 1601 before construction even began.

The tower

Construction of the tower began four years after the Grand Master died, in 1605. It was still under construction in 1607. It was built on a promontory, between Wied il-Kbir and Wied Biljun. The tower had a number of guns mounted on its roof which had equidistant embrasures along each of its sides.

In the mid-18th century, a bastioned enceinte was proposed around the tower, but it was never built. Eventually, Fort Chambray was built on the opposite side of Mġarr.

The tower had a small chapel dedicated to St Catherine of Siena and later St Martin that was intended for use by the four militia members in the tower but was also open to the public. It became an unofficial parish church for the people of the nearby villages.

After 243 years, the tower was demolished in 1848. Its masonry was used to build the bridge linking Mġarr to Nadur. The Mġarr Hotel was built over the site of the tower, but it has since closed down.

Legacy
Although the tower no longer exists, it still has an important place in Malta's history. This was the first coastal watchtower built by the Order. Garzes' successor, Alof de Wignacourt, later built a series of large watchtowers or small forts that are known as the Wignacourt towers. Other Grand Masters built smaller watchtowers such as the Lascaris and De Redin towers.

Since Garzes Tower has been demolished, the oldest tower still standing in Malta is the Wignacourt Tower in St. Paul's Bay, which was built in 1610. The oldest tower on Gozo is the Xlendi Tower that was built in 1650 (a tower in Marsalforn had also been built in 1616 but it collapsed in around 1715).

References

Fortified towers in Malta
Hospitaller fortifications in Malta
Towers completed in 1607
Buildings and structures demolished in 1848
Demolished buildings and structures in Malta
Għajnsielem
Former towers
1605 establishments in Malta
Limestone buildings in Malta
17th-century fortifications
1848 disestablishments in Malta